"Absolutely Immune" is the second single from Act. Unlike the previous single "Snobbery and Decay" and its myriad of release formats,  "Absolutely Immune" was only released on one 7" and two 12" single formats. The song reached #97 in the UK Singles Chart.

The band's 2004 box set Laughter, Tears and Rage - The Anthology featured a number of previously unreleased tracks from this single. These include an instrumental version of "Bloodrush" entitled "Bloodrush" (Silent), as well as an instrumental version of "Absolutely Immune" and a mix called "Absolutely Immune" (Take 4).

Track listing 
All songs written and composed by Thomas Leer and Claudia Brücken, except where noted.

7" vinyl 
 UK: ZTT / IMM 1

12" vinyl 
 UK: ZTT / TIMM 1

UK: ZTT / VIMM 1

Charts

References

External links 
  

1987 songs
1987 singles
Act (band) songs
Song recordings produced by Stephen Lipson
ZTT Records singles